Al Futaisi is an island about  southwest of Abu Dhabi in the United Arab Emirates with a size of approximately .

The discovery of old water catchments showed that the original settlement of Futaisi dates back several hundred years. Although the island does currently not have any fresh water, it supports a diverse flora and fauna with Dugong, Osprey, lizards (Uromastyx) and Gazelles.

Futaisi is not connected to the mainland by bridges but has a small airport and a boat dock.

A special sign of the owner of the island, Hamad bin Hamdan Al Nahyan, was the construction of a waterway formed by Latin letters in the south of the island "at ", which produced the word 'HAMAD'. The project was abandoned and the waterway filled in by 2012.

References

Islands of the Emirate of Abu Dhabi